Vatica chartacea is a tree in the family Dipterocarpaceae, native to Borneo. The specific epithet chartacea means "papery", referring to the leaves.

Description
Vatica chartacea grows as a medium-sized tree. The inflorescences bear cream flowers.

Distribution and habitat
Vatica chartacea is endemic to Borneo. Its habitat is on lowland hills, in wet areas and by rivers.

Conservation
Vatica chartacea has been assessed as endangered on the IUCN Red List. It is threatened by land conversion for plantations and by logging for its timber.

References

chartacea
Endemic flora of Borneo
Plants described in 1978